Elliott Ruggles Corbett  (1884 – 1963) was a Portland, Oregon banker, business leader, owner and builder of a number of the city's buildings, as well as civic leader and benefactor. He was born 29 June 1884 in Portland Oregon and died 2 May 1963 at his home in Dunthorpe, Portland, Oregon, aged 78. He and his two brothers, Henry Ladd Corbett (1881 – 1957) and Hamilton Forbush Corbett (1888 – 1966) were required at a young age to take on the burdens of the businesses, banking and real estate holdings that their grandfather Henry W. Corbett had developed, as their father Henry Jagger Corbett (and his younger brother Hamilton Corbett) had both died, predeceasing their own father.

His grandfather

Elliott Corbett's grandfather US Senator Henry W. Corbett (1827 – 1903) died when Elliott was 18. Henry W. Corbett had been born in Massachusetts and started the Corbett family dynasty in Oregon when he arrived at the tiny settlement of Portland in 1851, having crossed the Isthmus of Panama which he had reached by boat from New York. He had previously chartered a ship in New York and sent it, loaded with hardware, dry goods and other items, around Cape Horn bound for Portland, Oregon. He became an astute and successful businessman in Portland and Oregon and developed many of the various sinews of industry and finance that the growing city of Portland required. He also served as a US Senator from Oregon.

Parents

Henry Jagger Corbett (1857-1895) was Henry W. Corbett's eldest son. Henry Jagger Corbett was born 6 November 1857. He died on 2 March 1895 from tuberculosis in Colorado Springs, Colorado aged 37. He had married in 1879, sixteen years before his death, Helen Kendall Ladd (1859-1936), the eldest daughter of William S. Ladd, one of the senior Corbett's fellow Portland business pioneers and an associate in a number of enterprises.

Henry Jagger Corbett and Helen Ladd had three sons Henry Ladd Corbett (born 28 July 1881), Elliott Ruggles Corbett (born 29 June 1884) and Hamilton Forbush Corbett (born 13 December 1888). Both Henry Jagger and his only brother the original Hamilton Forbush Corbett (1859-1884) died of tuberculosis before their father. Mrs. Helen Ladd Corbett, Henry Jagger's widow, was left to bring up the three boys.

Education

Elliott was educated at the Portland Academy, a predecessor educational institution of the present Catlin Gable school.  He then went to Harvard University, graduating in 1907, from where his two brothers also graduated. All were football players at Harvard and also became keen polo players.

Elliott was ten years old when his father died. His older brother Harry (Henry L. Corbett) was fourteen and his younger brother Ham (Hamilton F. Corbett) was seven.

His mother was aware that without a father the boys needed to be taught by others the skills that she felt young men would need. So as to be able to acquire good horsemanship and learn to be good shots she sent them as young boys to spend parts of their summers at the P Ranch in Eastern Oregon with men who could teach them those. The P Ranch was then owned by the French-Glenn Livestock Company and run by Peter French.

There they learned to be expert shots with a rifle, a shotgun and a hand gun (revolver); to rope cattle and herd and tie them; to control pack trains and to become good outdoorsmen; to set-up camp and to learn fly fishing. Their mother, Helen Ladd Corbett, also saw that they were well schooled in lesser matters that would serve them in later life, like the proper use of an axe and various practical uses with their hands like how to understand the new motor vehicle engines; be able to fix them, change tires and keep them running on remote journeys; to carve meat expertly for guests for the dinner table and to be able to do things she thought men should be able to do well and with expertise. In this, as a widow, she was successful in preparing them for their life ahead.

Early responsibilities

With the death of their grandfather Henry W. Corbett in 1903, Elliott and his two brothers inherited his businesses, including 27 downtown Portland properties, among them the then First National Bank Building (predating the present one that they later built), The Worcester Block (Third and Oak Sts.), The Cambridge Block (Third and Morrison), the Neustadter building (Ankeny and Fifth), the Hamilton Building (529 SW Third Avenue)  as well as majority ownership of the eight floor-326 bedroom Portland Hotel.

Following their grandfather's death in 1903, within seven years his estate of 27 downtown buildings increased in value by over 500% owing to the financial boom and population growth stimulated by the Lewis and Clark Exposition, of which their grandfather had been an original financial backer  and its chairman.

The brothers also became involved with part of the Ladd estate and businesses which their mother Helen Kendall Ladd Corbett had inherited on the death of her father William S. Ladd, the Corbett brothers' maternal grandfather. She was actively involved with the direction of the Ladd estate businesses along with her Ladd siblings and mother.

In World War I Elliott served as a first lieutenant in the field artillery, stationed at Camp Zachary Taylor, Louisville, Kentucky.

Corbett Investment Company

The Corbett Investment Company was formed by the three Corbett brothers, Henry Ladd Corbett, Elliott Ruggles Corbett and Hamilton Forbush Corbett. The Corbett Investment Company was to serve as the Corbett estate holding company and their investment arm. The shares were equally owned by the three brothers. The brothers divided up Corbett Investment Company responsibilities to play to each of the brother's strengths, their developing expertise and special areas of interest.

Henry L. Corbett, the eldest, was the public face of the Corbett brothers. He dedicated most of his time to state politics as a Republican state senator, the Port of Portland Commission and he took myriad other corporate directorships and had many civic and cultural affiliations. He was also mainly responsible for their P Ranch.
Elliott R. Corbett was responsible for the management of their First National Bank of Portland holdings and the Corbett estate. He  also served on family and other boards and was involved in Oregon and civic causes.

Hamilton F. Corbett was President of the Security and Saving Trust Company, a company the brothers controlled through the First National Bank of Portland and President of the Portland Chamber of Commerce. In the First World War he served in France. He aided many civic causes and volunteer organisations.

The three Corbett brothers concentrated their efforts on their real estate businesses, the First National Bank of Portland and its subsidiaries, which they controlled and other investments that needed their own managing and financing. They left their other company holdings inherited from their grandfather H. W. Corbett, with experienced managements already in place, such as their holdings in Union Pacific Railroad, the Portland headquartered Home Telephone Company, the Oregon Electric Railway, the Oregon Surety and Casualty Company and the Portland Hotel, to largely operate on their own, usually retaining the role of directors (occasionally as officers) or even just passive shareholders so as to free themselves from their active day-to-day management.

The Corbett Investment Company's offices were located in the Corbett Building, at Southwest Fifth Avenue and Morrison, overlooking the Pioneer Courthouse. The brothers completed the building in 1907, four years after their grandfather's death.  The Corbett Investment Company offices were on the tenth floor, Suite 1011 at the north east corner but the mailing address was simply the Corbett Investment Company, Corbett Building, Portland, Oregon. The relatively compact space provided three offices for the brothers and an area for two secretaries and a filing and lunch room. From this modest space they oversaw their entire business holdings with their accountants in a separately accessed office on the same floor of the Corbett building.

In 1956 the brothers sold their remaining buildings and gave up management of downtown Portland properties.

After the deaths of the Corbett brothers, the 81-year-old Corbett Building was demolished by implosion on Sunday, 1 May 1988 (See Portland Buildings below).

First National Bank of Portland

The Corbett family had been the major stockholders in the First National Bank of Portland since in 1869 when Henry W. Corbett and his brother-in-law Henry Failing (with his father Josiah Failing) purchased almost all the shares of the Bank. H. W. Corbett held 500 shares, Henry Failing 250 and his father Josiah 50.

The First National Bank of Portland had been the only bank in Portland (and for a long time the only one west of the Rocky Mountains) that was chartered under the National Banking Act. The act was intended to make banking safer and guarantee the value of bank notes in effect creating a nationwide currency. There was no state-banking act in Oregon until 1907 so other banks at the time were strictly private proprietorships taking deposits and lending money without regulation. The First National was the exception from its outset.

On their purchase, Henry Failing had become President of the bank, Henry W. Corbett the Vice-President. Failing held the position until his unexpected death in 1898 when Corbett assumed the President’s role until his own death in 1903.

Elliott Corbett looked after the interests of the Corbett brothers in the Bank on behalf of the Corbett estate and also served as Vice-President and a director of the bank.

On H.W. Corbett's death Abbot L. Mills was appointed President and the bank continued to prosper and grow. He retired in 1927. C.F. Adams succeeded him as President from 1927 until 1932.

The Bank grew solidly under the Mills and Corbett stewardship and soon had outgrown its quarters, so they constructed a new building as its main office. In 1916 the new First National Bank building was opened at 401–409 SW 5th Avenue, Portland. The building became known as "The Marble Temple".

After Mills' retirement and when his successor C.F. Adams was nearing retirement, Elliott Corbett needed to prepare a successor to Adams. Since 1911 the Strong and McNaughton Trust Company had managed the properties of the Corbett estate. So in 1928 Elliott Corbett offered their Trust a merger with the First National's Security and Saving Trust Company. He also offered the position of a bank vice-president to MacNaughton. MacNaughton accepted Corbett's offer, although Strong opted to remain in his own Trust business managing the Corbett estate.

Banking in Portland, however, would change. The West Coast Bancorp merged with the US National Bank in early 1928. With this development Elliott Corbett knew that to stay ahead of their rivals the Corbetts and the other major stockholders, the Failings and Lewis families, would likely have to inject more capital into the bank to expand. Otherwise they could make a public share offering to increase the bank's capital. Elliott Corbett had been concerned for a while that bank shares were undervalued.  Banking was therefore a less attractive investment than real estate and other opportunities which were opening up to them for the utilisation of their capital. He and the other stockholders were not in favour of increasing its capital by injecting more of their own or in diluting their own shareholdings by issuing more shares through a public offering. During the years since the Corbetts had been involved, the First National bank had been regarded as solidly run and "typifying the extreme conservatism for which Portland had been celebrated for half a century."

The option was therefore open to them to sell the bank. It was an attractive option for the Corbetts and to the other minority stockholders. A ready purchaser was quickly found in the San Francisco based Transamerica, which owned Bank of America and Bancitaly, which was trying to strengthen its position on the West coast to compete with the New York and East coast banks. An agreement was signed with Transamerica, in June 1930 and completed in 1932.

As a result, for the first time in over sixty years the Corbett family no longer controlled a bank in Portland.

Portland buildings

In addition to the buildings that their grandfather Henry W. Corbett built and left in the estate, most of them on a smaller scale, the three Corbett brothers through the Corbett Investment Company built and owned a number of additional downtown buildings.  Among them were:

The Corbett Building 
The Corbett Building, located at Southwest Fifth Avenue and Morrison, Portland Oregon (its mailing address was simply the Corbett Building, Portland, Oregon). The ten-story building was designed by Whidden & Lewis and completed in 1907. It "represented the arrival of the modern steel-framed skyscraper to Portland." The offices of the Corbett brothers were on the 10th floor. Their grandfather Henry W. Corbett's Multnomah Building occupied the site previously. The Corbett Building was demolished by implosion in 1988, after the three brothers' deaths, to make way for Pioneer Place. It had been sold earlier by them on their retirement from building ownership in 1956.

The Pacific Building 
The Pacific Building, located at 520 SW Yamhill. Portland Oregon. The ten-story building was completed in 1925. The architect was A.E. Doyle and Associates. A young Pietro Belluschi worked on its design, and later had the opportunity to work there when Doyle moved the firm to the building. The Pacific building was built on the landscaped grounds on northern half of the downtown block of the H. W. Corbett mansion where a number of eastern hardwood trees had stood  opposite the present Pioneer Courthouse. Here his widow, Mrs. Corbett, continued to live and grazed her cow for fresh milk. The Pacific Building had the first underground parking garage in Portland that utilised unseen almost the entire block although the Pacific Building only utilises about half the block. The garage then extended beneath the reduced grounds of the H.W. Corbett mansion which previously occupied the entire block bounded by Taylor, 5th Avenue, Yamhill and Sixth Avenues. After the Pacific Building's erection the house, coach house and garden sat adjacent to the south. It was still the residence of his widow Emma and she remained here until her death in 1936. The Pacific Building is now listed on The National Register of Historic Places.

The Corbett Brothers Auto Storage Garage 

The Corbett Brothers Auto Storage Garage (Broadway Garage), designed by A. E. Doyle. Completed in 1925. It was Portland's first self-service ramp garage. Access was off Pine Street. Store fronts were located on Sixth, Broadway and Pine. It is built in reinforced concrete. Alterations were made for the Corbetts by Pietro Belluschi in 1948. Listed on The National Register of Historic Places.

In November 1956 the brothers began their transition into retirement. These buildings in addition to the other Corbett holdings were sold.

Other business involvements

Elliott Corbett served on the Board of the Livestock State Bank (1914–1918), the Portland Home Telephone Company (1911–1918) and the American Mail Line (1947–1953) amongst others.
He was President (1942–1943) and Trustee of the Portland Association of Building Owners and Managers.

The P Ranch

The Corbett brothers had enjoyed their boyhood days spent at the P Ranch in the Harney Basin of Eastern Oregon. At that time it had been owned by the French-Glenn Livestock Company and run by Peter French. This ranch was a vast spread in the Harney Basin watershed of the Steens Mountain and Blue Mountains. At the time of French's death, the P Ranch ran some seventy miles from the foothills of Steens Mountains to the south edge of Malheur Lake. "The P Ranch was the greatest ranch in that country, compromising, with its satellite ranches, one hundred and forty thousand acres." Since it owned all the strategic waterholes and streams it also controlled vast acres of public range lands. In 1903 the ranch additionally controlled 622,000 acres of grassland range leased from the government.

Subsequently in 1906, when Henry Corbett was 25 and Elliott Corbett was 22, Charles Erskine Scott Wood, their grandfather's former lawyer, advised them that the heirs of French-Glenn Livestock Company which then owned the Ranch were interested in selling. Wood became a minority partner with the Corbett brothers in the sale  and he represented the Corbett brothers during the acquisition. 

In 1906, when the Corbett brothers purchased it, the ranch was no longer a going concern as all the cattle had previously been sold.  It was renamed the Blitzen Valley Land Company. Bill Hanley, an owner of ranches in the area, was appointed their manager. He was someone they had known from their boyhood there. Their aim was to restore it to a successful working ranch but the Blitzen Valley Land Company had first to improve the distribution of the water resources in the valley. They soon had increasing numbers of cattle on the range again. Between 1907 and 1913 the company built 17 and a half miles of new channels from the Donner and Blitzen Rivers in order to improve drainage of the wetlands. They also authorised construction of eight miles of the Busse Ditch and four miles of the Stubblefield Ditch to improve water distribution in the north end of the valley.

In 1916 the Corbetts reorganised the operation as the Eastern Oregon Livestock Company (EOLC) and sold about 40 percent  of it to Louis Swift, the owner of the Chicago meat packing company Swift Brothers. The Eastern Oregon Livestock Company's P Ranch then ran about 20,000 head of cattle but probably through lack of hay or other reasons they had heavy losses of cattle numbers in the next two years.

In 1917 the Corbetts' and Swift's Eastern Oregon Livestock Company began the operation of their Harney Valley Railroad Company to transport its livestock out of the ranch with Henry L. Corbett becoming the railway's president.

In 1918 the company constructed an irrigation ditch along the west side of the valley.

In 1924 the Eastern Oregon Livestock Company built the Frenchglen Hotel about a mile away from the ranch house for cattle buyers and others having business with the ranch, as the nearest settlement was at Burns, Oregon, over sixty miles away.

In 1928 the Corbett brothers sold Swift all their remaining controlling shares in the company (EOLC). This was twenty-two years after their original investment and the brothers were apparently relieved to dispose of their remaining shares in the company to Swift as by then it was a losing proposition. Even the Swifts, as leading meatpackers, found it difficult to run profitably from 1928 until 1935 when they finally sold it to the US Government.

The P Ranch was sold to the Federal government because the government needed the Blitzen Valley water rights to protect water levels on the Malheur Lake Bird Reservation. A part of the property is now the Malheur National Wildlife Refuge and the rest is managed by the United States Fish and Wildlife Service. Some of the remaining P Ranch Buildings (the main ranch house burned down in 1947), the Long Barn, French's Round Barn (for training horses) and the Beef Wheel and the Frenchglen Hotel are now listed on the National Register of Historic Places.

Years later the P Ranch range lands became a source of contention when on 2 January 2016 the Occupation of the Malheur National Wildlife Refuge occurred, a militant protest and occupation lasting a number of weeks, led by some Nevada state ranchers protesting against US Federal control of lands. The standoff was covered on a daily basis by the US and international media. 
 
The investment had always been one of the Corbetts' less fortunate undertakings. It proved too large to manage effectively in those days with poor communications, especially by absentee landlords. When Elliott Corbett was asked if he had appreciated owning this childhood haunt, he replied that while he had enjoyed the place as boy, as an owner it had been a constant financial drain on him. It was a costly early lesson to the brothers who never again invested in ventures in which they had an emotional attachment, nor in enterprises that they were not able to oversee directly.

Public service and charitable activities

Elliott Corbett was involved with a number of charitable causes.

Oregon Voter on Elliott Corbett role

The Oregon Voter described his contribution. "In his long work in community and public affairs...he gave freely... of his knowledge and experience as a banker and manager of a family estate, to those charitable, philanthropic and educational institutions so that today most of them have sound budgets and practical administration procedures they might not have had but for him. ... He was kindly but firm [to others] working with him [giving] an education in what to find in a financial statement and the knack of seeing weakness and waste...in [what are] important facets of public philanthropy".

Among these were:

The Oregon Historical Society
A life member and a director of the Society from 1942 until his death in 1963. He was its president when it acquired the present Park Block site.

Portland Art Museum
Elliott Corbett and his two brothers donated to the Portland Art Museum a number of art works from their mother Helen Ladd Corbett's collection of art after her death.

Portland Library Association
A director (1911-1918).

Portland Community Chest (later the United Way)
A founder and director (1935-1945), President  1943-1944.

Oregon War Chest
A Director (1943-1945).

Multnomah County Relief League
Chairman.

Portland Committee on War Finance
Responsible for the Victory Bond drive and the voluntary financing of the War effort, Liberty Ships etc.)Chairman.

The Red Cross
Organiser of the Portland Chapter of the American Red Cross.

U.S Committee for Care of European Children
Chairman.

Reed College Elliott R. Corbett Loan Fund
Established in his memory in 1963 as a financial aid program for students to have access to loans when needed.

Elliott R. Corbett Chart Room
Part of The Oregon Historical Society's Library and Archives created as part of a donation in his memory when their present building was being built.

Liberty Ships
Elliott Corbett was one of those behind raising the funds for the building of Liberty ships, among them SS. Henry W. Corbett (launched 29 March 1943), SS William S. Ladd (13 September 1943), SS Henry Failing (7 April 1943) and SS Abbot L. Mills (18 October 1943) built by the Oregon Shipbuilding Corporation.

Clubs
Life membership in: the Arlington Club (past President), The University Club, the Multnomah Athletic Club (all in Portland) and the Harvard Club (New York). and the Deschutes Fishing Club, Oregon.

Alta. S. Corbett (wife)

Elliott Corbett and Alta Rittenhouse Smith married in Portland on September 1, 1909. She was born 10 June 1886 in Portland, Oregon, and died 9 September 1976 in Portland, aged 90. She was the daughter of Albert T. Smith (1833-1913) and Laura Rittenhouse (1852-1928) who moved to Portland in 1870. They built the first house in Portland Heights at what is now SW Carter Lane and Vista Avenue and gave Portland Heights its name (after their house The Heights).
 
Alta graduated from the Portland Academy in 1904  and was a 1908 honours graduate and Senior Councillor of Smith College at Northampton, Massachusetts. After graduation and before her marriage, she became a teacher. That was an early manifestation of her life-long interest in education and to furthering women's and civil rights.

Oregon Journal editorial Alta Corbett: True Civic Leader

The Oregon Journal published an Editorial after her death on 13 September 1976:

Alta Corbett: True Civic Leader
Alta Smith Corbett died at the age of 90, with several of her final years having been spent in a convalescent home. Probably as a result, there are those who either never knew or had forgotten what a really remarkable career this woman had.She was not one of those who merely "lend" their names to good causes.For example, it was she who launched the drive for the present excellent Oregon Historical Society Building with a gift of $100,000 as a memorial to her late husband, Elliott R. Corbett.The list of those organisations to which she gave service reads almost like a directory of agencies devoted to the "better life."For example, she was a director of the National League of Women Voters, president of the Portland League of Women Voters, an original board member of the Girl Scouts, a trustee of Reed College and a member of the Riverdale School Board, trustee of Catlin Gabel School, president of the Portland Women's Union which built and operated the Martha Washington Hotel for women, founding member of Urban League and a member of the board of the Community Chest and the YWCA Travelers Aid.She was the daughter of Albert and Laura Rittenhouse Smith, and her parents built the first house in Portland Heights.Thus, she was a true daughter of Portland. And like so many of that early-day breed, she was not content to sit and enjoy the luxuries of life.She used her time and energy to make Portland a better place in which we live.

Among the women's and educational organisations she was involved with were:

Portland Equal Suffrage League
Appointed by Abigail Scott Duniway, Pacific Northwest suffragist, to its Finance Committee in 1912, not long after graduating from Smith.

The Oregon Equal Suffrage Amendment was passed by the Oregon legislature in 1912 largely through the initiatives of the League and  the efforts of these women. It meant that from then on women then had the right to vote in Oregon statewide elections and run for office in Oregon.

Oregon Equal Suffrage Alliance
President, 1918 - 1919 

She was president of the Oregon Equal Suffrage Alliance during these two pivotal years in obtaining women's equal suffrage giving them the right to vote throughout the United States. The United States Congress had passed the 19th Amendment to the United States Constitution on June 4, 1919 that would guarantee all women the right to vote but this then had to be submitted for ratification of three quarters of the states to secure adoption as part of the United States Constitution. The amendment was the culmination of a decades-long movement for women's suffrage in the United States, at both the state and national levels, and part of the worldwide movement towards women's suffrage and a forerunner of the movement towards women's rights.
Mrs. Corbett had called a large meeting of the Alliance  at the Multnomah Hotel in Portland on November 7, 1919 with representation from throughout the state at which leading US suffragette Carrie Chapman Catt spoke. It was agreed by the meeting and supported by Mrs. Catt that "Mrs. Elliott Corbett call a meeting ... to draft an appeal to the legislators to urge a special session" [of the Oregon legislature]. Mrs Corbett with two other women, Mrs. C.B. Simmons and Mrs. Harry B. Beales Torrey, of Portland met Governor Olcott and his executive on November 28, 1919. Mrs. Corbett, who acted as spokesman for the delegation, urged the governor to call a special session as until then he had been reluctant to do so. Mrs Corbett: "We feel that Oregon's influence is needed in the event that the so-called doubtful states are to ratify..." To that end the Alliance would welcome a special session of the legislature to ratify. If the expense of this was an objection of the Governor, Mrs. Corbett said that the women of the state stood ready to bear the expense of gathering the lawmakers. The governor responded that if the legislators asked for a special session, agreed to waive the per diem and mileage and confine their work to the Amendment he would call a special session. [In the event the women's offer to cover the costs did not prove necessary as the Alliance contacted all the legislators and they agreed to call for a special session and waive all expenses to vote on the Amendment]. 
The Oregon legislature in special session voted to ratify the 19 Amendment a few weeks later on January 12, 1920, and on January 14, 1920 the resolution was filed by the Oregon Secretary of State and Oregon became the 25th state to ratify. After the required 36 states (3/4 of the then 48 states) had voted in the affirmative the Amendment was ratified by the US Congress on August 18, 1920 and the 19th Amendment then became part of the U.S. Constitution guaranteeing all women the right to vote.

League of Women Voters

Portland president 1938-40.National president 1940-42.Portland honorary president 1944. Supported the magazine The Voice of American Women.

The national Community Chest
Appointed by Eleanor Roosevelt in 1933 as the Oregon representative to the national Community Chest, the forerunner of the United Way, during the Depression.

Urban League of Portland
A founding member in 1945 of this civil rights organisation.Vice-President 1947, during the Portland Vanport district flood where the league was actively involved in aiding the largely black population there.

She described the league at the time as "a professionally staffed agency working to improve conditions to create a better climate of interracial understanding. The program focuses on job development, and employment, education and youth incentives, housing and health and welfare..."

Portland Women's Union
Vice-President.
 
Founded in 1887 to assist working women. The PWU was the first all-women volunteer organization in the state of Oregon. Its primary mission was to provide a safe and respectable residence for women coming to Portland until they found a job or became married. Alta Corbett gave it her enthusiastic support. She was Vice-President when it opened the Martha Washington Hotel in downtown Portland. The hotel provided a homelike environment for the single woman who was ready and willing to work for a living. It housed eighty women over four stories, including sitting rooms, dining room and laundry and other facilities. The Women's Union also taught secretarial skills there at night classes.

The Girl Scouts
Original Board member in Portland.

Oregon Historical Society
Alta Corbett helped launch the drive for the funds necessary for the erection of Oregon Historical Society Building with a financial donation in memory of her husband, Elliott R. Corbett. The present OHS Building at 1200 SW Park Avenue is on the site which her late husband had helped acquire. She was an Honorary Member of the Life Council of the society. The Oregon Historical Society Newsletter wrote after her death that Alta Corbett was "...an inspired and generous leader...So we find our great examples from history not only from Greece, Rome, Jerusalem, Cadiz...often we might look closer in space and time. Sometimes our inspiration is nearer at hand among those we have known, loved, and laboured with...".

Schools' and Universities

Riverdale School. Dunthorpe. Portland, Oregon. Board (1915-1930).Smith College. Trustee (1931-1939). Reed College. Regent (1919-1941) and Trustee (1931-1934).  Catlin Gabel School. Trustee (1949-1951).

The Alta S. Corbett Lectureship Fund at Reed College
Established through a donation by her five daughters in her name the year after her death in 1976 and continues to support symposiums, lectures, grants and collective research fellowships.

The Alta S. Corbett Grants for Research in Political Science, Reed College
A Reed College bursary.

Oregon State Song
The Oregon State Song Oregon, My Oregon, composed by Henry B. Murtagh with lyrics by John Andrew Buchanan, was chosen from 212 submissions by a committee of five of which she was one of the members and designated by the Oregon Legislature as the state song in 1927.

Daughters

Elliott and Alta had five daughters and no sons  who they brought up with the aid of Nurse Cochrane:

Caroline Ladd Corbett
Born 20 September 1910 in Portland Oregon.  She died 28 August 1989 [aged 79] at East Runton, Norfolk, UK. She attended Riverdale School and Miss Catlin's School (now Catlin Gabel School) in  Portland and Smith College, Massachusetts. After graduating Cum Laude she worked as the Personal Assistant to the US Secretary of State, Henry L. Stimson before her marriage to Ivison Macadam (1894-1974), Director General of the Royal Institute of International Affairs (Chatham House) in St James's Square, London, UK. They married on 1 January 1934 in Dunthorpe, Portland, Oregon and lived in London and at Runton Old Hall, East Runton, Norfolk, UK. They had four children, Helen Ivison Taylor, William Ivison Macadam, Elliott Corbett Macadam and Caroline Alta Macadam Colacicchi.

Gretchen (Day) Corbett
Born 2 November 1912 in Portland Oregon. She died 10 October 2004 [aged 91]. Like all her sisters she attended Riverdale School and Miss Catlin's School (now Catlin Gabel School). She married Dr. John Poulsen Trommald in 1934 in Boston Massachusetts. She was active in civic organisations including the Visiting Nurses Association, President; English Speaking Union, Oregon Historical Society and was appointed to the Executive Committee of the Citizen’s Conference on Oregon Courts in 1968. Active in Republican Party politics, she was an Oregon delegate to the 1960 Republican National Convention. She was involved in the creation of the Oregon Women’s Division of the Nixon-Agnew Campaign Committee in 1968. They had four children, John Poulsen Trommald, Elliott Corbett Trommald, Susan Trommald Roff and Peter Gunder Trommald.

Lesley (Judy) Corbett
Born 13 April 1915 in Dunthorpe, Portland, Oregon. She died on November 5, 2013, [aged 98] at Portland. She attended Riverdale School, Miss Catlin's School (now Catlin Gabel School), Portland, the Branson School, Ross, California and Smith College, Massachusetts. She married Dr. Donald Forster  on 16 September 1939. She was like her husband a keen fly fisher. Active in the Portland Community, she served on the Board of Trustees of Reed College, the Parry Centre, Oregon Museum of Science and Industry (OMSI), and the Board of Riverdale School. She was an active supporter of the Portland Art Museum, the Oregon Historical Society, Smith College, Catlin Gabel School and the League of Women Voters. They had four children, Dale Edward Forster, Robert Douglas Forster, William Lloyd Forster and Helen Forster Chapman.

Alta (Teta) Corbett
Born 26, May 1918 in Dunthorpe, Portland, Oregon. She "set off on her next great adventure" on 28 August 2017 [aged 99] at Sequim, Washington. She attended Riverdale School, and Smith College. Nature was important in her life. She was a horseback rider, fly fisher and poet. In her early twenties she made solo ascents of the Pacific Northwest's mountains, Mount Rainier, Mount Hood, Mount Adams, the Three Sisters and Mount St. Helens. During World War II she first worked in the US War Department for Air Branch G-2  and on its formation she transferred to the Women Airforce Service Pilots, the WASP, where she flew as a Squadron Leader. She married Ralph Russell Thomas on 8 June 1961 in Portland Oregon starting married life on the Oregon Coast. Later, they self built a house and farm in Sequim, Washington on the Olympic Peninsula. In 2010, the WASP were recognised for service during WWII, and at 92, she was awarded the Congressional Gold Medal in Washington, DC. They had two daughters Deborah Thomas McGoff and Caroline (Kelly) Ladd Thomas.

Lucy Elliott Corbett
Born 16 March 1922 in Dunthorpe, Portland, Oregon – Died on 23 October 2007 aged 85 at Portland. She attended Riverdale School, and Scripps College, Claremont, California. She married Richard J. Marlitt on September 16, 1955 in Portland, Oregon.  Lucy served in the Red Cross during World War II and during the reconstruction of Germany afterwards. She was a generous donor to the Portland Art Museum of the works she and her husband had collected by the American Ashcan School and American Impressionism School of painters. She was a board member and active supporter of various other social and cultural organisations including the Portland Art Museum, the Oregon Historical Society and many others. They had two sons Thomas Corbett Marlitt and Michael Ladd Marlitt.

Named after him

Elliott R. Corbett II

Elliott and Alta had no sons but Elliott's brother Henry L. Corbett named his youngest son after him, Elliott Ruggles Corbett II (1922-1944). He was killed in action, aged 22, during the Allied liberation of Europe in WWII a few months before the end of hostilities. His parents donated the Elliott Corbett Memorial State Recreation Site in their son's memory). A website devoted to Elliott. R. Corbett II is at https://www.elliott-r-corbett-ii.com

Elliott also had two grandsons named after him, Elliott Corbett Trommald and Elliott Corbett Macadam.

Recreations

Elliott, along with his brothers, was a football player at Harvard University and at the Multnomah Athletic Club in his younger years. He was also a good horseman and polo player in Oregon. He was a keen fly fisherman and keen duck and quail hunter and excellent shot both with a shotgun, rifle and revolver. He and his wife took their family on camping trips with packhorse trains in the Oregon mountains. They also had a motor vessel, the Widgeon, in their younger years in which they sailed up the Pacific Coast with their friends and elder daughters and into the British Columbia inlets for the salmon fishing. Elliott was a regular Steelhead fisherman on the Deschutes River and others.

Residences

After their marriage Elliott Corbett and his wife lived in the Park Blocks at 243 W. Park Avenue Portland, now 1119 SW Park, formerly the W. M. Ladd residence. There Elliott Corbett and his brother Henry L. Corbett had adjoining properties. The sites of the two houses occupied the block that is now the location of the Portland Art Museum Mark Building across from the Oregon Historical Society Building. The Elliott Corbetts' first three daughters were born there.

Elliott and Alta Corbett then were intent on a move from the busy downtown area. Elliott and his brother Henry. L. Corbett commissioned A. E. Doyle and Associates to design two houses with adjoining grounds on six acres in Portland Heights which ultimately were never built.

Elliott Corbett and his wife in 1913 embarked on the building of a "country cottage" in what became the Dunthorpe area that was about to be opened up for development near Lake Oswego. While doing so the Corbetts decided to make the "cottage" at 01600 SW Greenwood Road in Dunthorpe, their main residence so their children could grow up in a semi-rural environment. It was completed in the fall of 1915 and the 32 year old Elliott Corbett and his 29 year old wife Alta moved there with their then three daughters in time for Thanksgiving. It was the first house to be built in the new area of Dunthorpe.

The Elliott Corbett property was set in 32 acres containing a two-story three-bay car garage with an under-car mechanic's well and workshop and staff quarters above, a separate barn and stables for their riding horses and groom's quarters (both entered by a side drive off the main circular one), a gardener's cottage adjacent to SW Iron Mountain Road (now Blvd.), a pair of tennis courts, a swimming pool and a children's "Swings and Rings" play area, all at a distance from the main house and mostly not within sight of it.

Many of their Portland friends thought it was an unwise move but Elliott's brother Henry Ladd Corbett decided to follow suit and soon many of the leading Portland families had decided to build their homes there. An area which used to seem quite a distance from Portland became a pleasant area to bring up large families.

The Elliott Corbett's five daughters were brought up there. After the three eldest were married and the two younger were away at College, Elliott took off part of the west end in 1939, including the large formal living room, and the second and third floor above it  to make the house more compact for their smaller family then living there and created a new formal West walled garden for his wife on the former larger West wing foundation.

The Elliott R. Corbett House is now listed on the National Register of Historic Places and its front appears today as it looked after Corbett made the modifications.

Elliott and Alta also had a beach house on the Oregon Coast at Gearhart, Oregon and in later years, after giving that  to their children and their families, had a smaller beach house on the sand dunes at Surf Pines, Oregon north of Gearhart.

Elliott and his son-in-law Dr. Donald Forster also built the Don Elliott fishing cabin on the Deschutes River in eastern Oregon.

Notes and references 

1884 births
1963 deaths
Businesspeople from Portland, Oregon
Elliott
Harvard University alumni
American bankers
Philanthropists from Oregon
Burials at River View Cemetery (Portland, Oregon)
People from Clatsop County, Oregon
20th-century American philanthropists